Mount Owen  is a mountain on the eastern coast of Palmer Land on the Antarctic Peninsula. It stands 1,105 m in height, and was named by Ronne for Arthur Owen, a member of the Ronne Antarctic Research Expedition.

References

Owen